Robert Ross Taylor  (June 16, 1940 – August 15, 2013), also known as Bob Taylor, was a Canadian wildlife photographer. He was known for his images of polar bears, great grey owls and bison.

Life and work
Taylor was born June 16, 1940 and grew up in the Toronto area. He earned a degree in 1963 from Ryerson Polytechnical Institute with a major in science photography.

Taylor began his career working with government agencies, museums and universities, first in Saskatchewan and then in Manitoba. Eventually he went out on his own, working as an independent photographer for the remainder of his career. His photographs were published in numerous magazines including LIFE, Canadian Geographic, and Reader's Digest. He published several books, focusing on his work in nature photography. Taylor was also involved in the production of several films, mostly documentary shorts of nature subjects.

Taylor travelled widely and was actively involved in arranging and leading trips so that others could experience photographing wildlife. Some credit his photography for encouraging interest in the destination of Churchill, Manitoba to view the annual polar bear migration.

Taylor was an accomplished carver who helped launch the Prairie Canada Carvers Association.

Books 
 The Edge of the Arctic: Churchill and the Hudson Bay Lowlands Winnipeg, Manitoba: Windemere House Publishing, 1992 
 The Manitoba Landscape-A Visual Symphony Altona, Manitoba: D. W. Friesen Sons, Limited, 1993 
 The Great Gray Owl: On Silent Wings Winnipeg, Manitoba: Windemere House Publishing, 1997  
 Manitoba: Seasons of Beauty Winnipeg, Manitoba: Windemere House Publishing, 2002.

Awards 
 Bronze Award, Columbus Film Festival for Assiniboine Forest
 Award for Creative Excellence, U.S. Industrial Film Festival, for Prairie Insights

Honours 
 Order of the Buffalo Hunt, Government of Manitoba
 Royal Canadian Academy of Arts
 Master of Photographic Arts, Professional Photographers of Canada
 Fellowship, Professional Photographers Association of Manitoba

Notes

External links
Robert R. Taylor (personal site) http://www.polarbearphotography.com/

1940 births
2013 deaths
Artists from Toronto
Canadian photographers
Members of the Royal Canadian Academy of Arts
Toronto Metropolitan University alumni